Statistics of Swiss Super League in the 1948–49 season.

Overview
It was contested by 14 teams, and FC Lugano won the championship.

League standings

Results

Sources 
 Switzerland 1948–49 at RSSSF

Swiss Football League seasons
Swiss
Football